Karel Kumpfmüller is a retired Czechoslovak-Canadian slalom canoeist who competed from the late 1960s to the late 1970s. He won two medals at the 1967 ICF Canoe Slalom World Championships in Lipno nad Vltavou, with a gold in the C-1 team event and a bronze in the C-1 event.

References

Czechoslovak male canoeists
Czech male canoeists
Canadian male canoeists
Living people
Year of birth missing (living people)
Medalists at the ICF Canoe Slalom World Championships